1 South African Tank Regiment is an armoured regiment of the South African Army, based at the Tempe military base in Bloemfontein as part of the South African Army Armour Formation.

History

Origin
The Regiment was established in April 1999, composed of members of the old Tank Wing of the National Defence Force's School of Armour.

Role
This unit supplies the only full-time tank force to the SA Army.

Lt Col William Nondala, the second CO, was the first black commanding officer appointed in the country's Armoured Corps.

There were 724 available posts, but only 335 were staffed and 389 vacant in 2005. The highest shortage level (75%) was experienced at the level of trooper.

Equipment and Operations
The unit trains jointly with the reserve force units to enhance the ‘one force’ concept, because the reserve force is the expansionary capability of the SANDF in times of national defence. There is however only a small percentage of active reserves, because training call-ups are limited, due to budgetary constraints.

It is equipped with the Olifant Mk.2 main battle tank. The unit’s structure is a ‘type 38 regiment’, with 2 tanks at regimental headquarters and 12 tanks each in the three operational squadrons. There are also support squadrons and tank transport squadrons. 

The Olifant tanks have been significantly upgraded with new power packs and stabilized night vision equipment. The vehicles are also capable of fire on the move manoeuvres. The Olifants may be replaced with a small number of new Main Battle Tanks some time after 2018.

 

Due to a lack of funds for their primary armoured role and a shortage of regular infantry, the unit has recently been deployed in their secondary line infantry role on border patrol and external peacekeeping operations in central Africa. The C (or third) squadron was deployed from April to July 2004 along the Lesotho border and received praise from the Tactical headquarters, police and the farming community. Another squadron was deployed from December 2004 to March 2005. Several members of the unit have also been deployed to the Democratic Republic of Congo, DRC  as part of the United Nations’ peacekeeping force MONUSCO and in Burundi as VIP protectors.

Insignia

Previous Dress Insignia

Current Dress Insignia

References

Armoured regiments of South Africa
Military units and formations in Bloemfontein
Military units and formations established in 1999
1999 establishments in South Africa